The 2012 FIA Alternative Energies Cup was a season of the FIA Alternative Energies Cup, a world championship for vehicles with alternative energy propulsion organized by the Fédération Internationale de l'Automobile. The season had eight rallies, beginning with Rally Montecarlo on 22 March.

For the final classifications, 50% rounded up of the best results plus one was taken into account.

Calendar and winners

Driver Standings cat. VII & VIII

Co-Driver Standings cat. VII & VIII

Manufacturer Standings cat. VII & VIII

References

FIA E-Rally Regularity Cup seasons
Alternative Energies Cup